Ferdinand Viceo Estrella (born September 5, 1979) is a Filipino politician who served as mayor of Baliwag, in office since 2016. Previously, he was a Barangay chairman of Poblacion from 2007 until 2016, and he served as ABC President of the municipality from 2010 until 2016.

Estrella is the son of former mayor Romeo Estrella, and he is married to Johnna Nubla. On March 17, 2020, he tested positive for COVID-19, and he was recovered on March 29.

References

1979 births
Living people
People from Bulacan